Awami League was a Pakistani political party founded by Huseyn Shaheed Suhrawardy in February 1950. Pir of Manki Sharif and Khan Ghulam Mohammad Khan from the North-West Frontier Province (NWFP) joined it soon afterwards.

History
In East Pakistan, East Pakistan Awami Muslim League was founded by Abdul Hamid Khan Bhashani and Yar Mohammad Khan in June 1949. It was established as the Bengali alternative to the Urdu dominated Muslim League in Pakistan and over centralization of the government. The party quickly gained massive popular support in East Bengal. In the 1954 provincial election in Bengal, the party won 143 seats. The United Front of East Pakistan led by Haq, Bhasani and Surahwardhy the party won a total of 223 seats, soundly defeating the Muslim League with 10 seats.

In 1950, Iftikhar Mamdot, who was dismissed from the premiership of Punjab, formed a party called Jinnah Muslim League. The two parties merged to form Jinnah Awami Muslim League prior to the provincial elections in 1951. In the Punjab provincial election in 1951, the Jinnah Awami Muslim League polled 18.3 percent votes and won 32 seats. In the NWFP, it won 4 seats.

Subsequently, the two parties merged in 1959 and used the name All Pakistan Awami Muslim League. The party later dropped All Pakistan and named the party Awami Muslim League in East Pakistan. Later, the party evolved under the leadership of Sheikh Mujibur Rahman (himself a former aide to Suharwardy) and was named the Awami League . After long arduous consultations and negotiations by Sheikh Mujibur Rahman with the west Pakistan establishment of remaining united as a single nation  without bloodshed eventually led the forces of Bangladesh nationalism in the struggle against West Pakistan's military, socio economic and political control, and the civil establishment.

After Operation Searchlight, In a radio address on the evening of March 26, Yahya Khan, the then president of Pakistan, declared the Awami League treasonous and banned the party. In addition to this, the government seized the bank accounts of the Awami League.

President

General Secretary

State leaders

Electoral history
Pakistan National Assembly elections

East Pakistan Provincial Assembly elections

References

Bibliography
 
 
 
 

Bangladesh Awami League
Muslim League breakaway groups
1949 establishments in Pakistan
Political parties established in 1949
Political parties disestablished in 1971
Defunct political parties in Pakistan